Resti may refer to:

 Resti (family), a noble family of the Republic of Ragusa
 Resti (Ferden), an alpine settlement in the municipality of Ferden in the Swiss canton of Valais
 Burgruine Resti, a ruined castle in the municipality of Meiringen in the Swiss canton of Bern